Coyote Lake is located in Grand Teton National Park, in the U. S. state of Wyoming.

Description
Coyote Lake sits in a cirque at the head of Open Canyon and can be reached from the Open Canyon Trail but requires off trail navigation to access. The lake is located at the head of the south fork on the Open Canyon trail.

In 1927 The Pinehole Roundup printed an article titled, "Two Weeks in the Rockies With a Forest Ranger by C.H. McDonald. In the article Coyote Lake was described as "Mud Lake". The writer detailed a story about their horse becoming stuck in the lake mud and struggling to free itself.

References

Lakes of Grand Teton National Park